Mir Mostaque Ahmed Robi (মীর মোস্তাক আহমেদ রবি) is a Bangladesh Awami League politician and the incumbent Member of Parliament from Satkhira-2.

Early life
Robi was born on 21 January 1954.

Career
Robi was elected to Parliament on 5 January 2014 from Satkhira-2 as a Bangladesh Awami League candidate. On 30 May 2019, his brothers, Mir Mahmud Hasan Lucky and Mahi Alam, attacked Stakhira District Press Club.

References

Awami League politicians
Living people
1954 births
10th Jatiya Sangsad members
11th Jatiya Sangsad members